Jason Stuart (born January 13, 1959), also known by his real name Stuart Ted Greif, is an American actor and comedian. He first won notice on Star Search, where he lost to Martin Lawrence. He came out publicly in 1993 on the syndicated daytime talk show Geraldo, and has been called "the first openly gay stand-up comedian" by various media outlets (a title Stuart himself rejects).

Early life
Stuart Ted Greif was born in The Bronx, New York, on January 13, 1959, and raised in Los Angeles, California.

His father Leonard Greif was Jewish and born in Poland. Leonard was only 10 years old when Nazi Germany invaded Poland. Jason's grandmother saw her best friends shot to death, and forced her family to flee even as other Jews and Poles argued that the Nazi occupation wouldn't be that bad. Leonard and his parents spent the war on the run, being hidden by Christian families. Jason's grandmother later learned that the rest of her family had been murdered.

Jason's father emigrated to the United States in 1949. Barely able to speak English, he got a job as a janitor. Jason's mother, Gloria, was born in Brooklyn in New York City. She was 17 years old when she married 22-year-old Leonard Greif. Leonard later got a job cutting ties from cloth in the New York City garment industry, and Gloria became a beautician.

The Greifs had three children: Steven, Stuart, and Karen. The family moved to the Fairfax neighborhood in central Los Angeles, California, when Jason was a year old. Jason Stuart describes his family as "not religious, but culturally Jewish." Jason Stuart says that his father and paternal grandparents suffered from post-traumatic stress syndrome, leaving them constantly angry and afraid. Both parents, he says, had outsize egos and refused to let anyone interrupt or silence them. In Los Angeles, Leonard obtained a job with Castle Neckwear, and eventually rose to the position of vice president. He later became wealthy investing in real estate.

As a closeted gay youth, Jason Stuart says he felt alienated from his dysfunctional family. His father, he says, was more focused on making money than on showing his children love. However, his father's focus on putting one's best self forward in business left Jason with a desire to always be true to himself. His mother inspired him to be an artist, and he began performing at the local Jewish community center when he was eight years old. He began taking acting seriously in junior high.

Jason Stuart was heavily bullied throughout his childhood for his perceived homosexuality. He developed a quick wit and sense of humor because he was terrified and because it was an effective defensive mechanism, "so they could laugh with me rather than at me," he later said. Being funny was also a way to express his feelings, even if they were hidden by irony or sarcasm.

Although he was always making jokes growing up, Stuart says he was despondent. "When I was a kid, everyone thought I was jovial, funny. But I was one of those suicidal kids who went to sleep wishing I wouldn't wake up."

He was attacked several times in junior high school after his peers assumed he was gay. The word "fag" was written on his locker, a girl punched him in the face (for which he was hospitalized), and another student beat him until he was unconscious.

As a child, Stuart was impressed by sarcastic and self-deprecating comedians such as Lucille Ball, Totie Fields, Paul Lynde, John Ritter, and Lily Tomlin. He also found actors Whoopi Goldberg, Dustin Hoffman, and Barbra Streisand inspiring. Streisand appealed to him most. He saw her in the film Funny Girl, and her "sad on the inside, funny on the outside" character seemed to mirror his own life.

Stuart's parents divorced when he was 17, and he left home a year later. Both parents later remarried (his mother four more times).

Career

Early acting career
Lacking any connections in the entertainment industry, Stuart called every agent listed in the Players Directory (a directory of talent and casting agents, published twice a year). He had a head shot taken, and sent the photograph to the producer of every television show he liked.

His first acting gig was as an extra on the comedy series One Day at a Time in 1977. He played a student, and had to exit through a door. He was so nervous that not only did he slam the wrong door, but he slammed the door so hard that its molding fell off.

Stuart supported himself by taking a wide range of odd jobs. He also took acting classes and studied under such prestigious teachers as Nina Foch, Harvey Lembeck, Roy London, Allan Miller, and Lawrence Parke. His first credited role on television came on the syndicated series The Life and Times of Eddie Roberts in 1980.

Stuart struggled to find work, however. Casting directors told him that he came across too gay and that no one would hire him. His agents did not know what parts they should have him audition for.

Early stand-up career
With acting gigs not forthcoming, Stuart's agent suggested in the early 1980s that he try stand-up comedy instead. Although he received neither encouragement nor financial assistance from his parents, he began a career as a professional comedian in 1983. He began touring in 1985.

Numerous comedy club gigs followed, and soon Stuart was headlining at mainstream venues. By 1987, Stuart was considered a major comedy star. That year, he appeared on the nationally syndicated talent show Star Search. Judges voted him superior to three other comedians, but Stuart lost in the fourth showdown to Martin Lawrence.

Post-coming out
Stuart came out publicly in the spring of 1993. His comedy act consisted of him acting heterosexual, even though he dressed outrageously or androgynously. He grew increasingly unhappy with his act, feeling he was lying to his audiences about who he was. Stuart realized he needed to come out while leading a class on self-esteem for young performers. After being heckled one day for coming off too effeminate, he told the heckler "I'm not gonna let you make me feel bad for being myself." When the teacher thanked him after the class for saying that, he realized he needed to come out professionally.

He first came out in early 1993 to an audience at The Laff Stop in Houston, Texas. Shortly thereafter, Geraldo Rivera invited him to appear in a segment on "Unconventional Comedians" on his nationally syndicated talk show Geraldo. Stuart not only came out of the closet during the show, but kissed Rivera on the air. Coming out made Stuart one of earliest openly gay comedians to be performing nationally, and according to journalist Connor Keaney he was widely said to be the first openly gay stand-up comedian. Stuart himself says such claims are inaccurate.

Stuart has described being an openly gay comedian in the 1990s as fraught with difficulties. He feared that coming out would cost him his day-job, and he was constantly aware that homophobes might physically attack him on stage or as he left the club. He worried that doing pre-show publicity would draw attention from those who might do him harm. Four times, he was picketed by members of the virulently homophobic Westboro Baptist Church. Bookers and other comedians would make fun of his sexuality, or openly harass him to get him to quit. Hosts would introduce him to audiences in crass or offensive ways.

In June 1994, Stuart performed his act on 
Broadway at the Town Hall theatre in OUTrageous Comedy '94, a benefit for the Gay Games hosted by Sandra Bernhard. He continued to do small roles on television, appearing on The John Larroquette Show, Murder, She Wrote, and seaQuest DSV, among others, but many casting directors openly refused to hire a gay man (and told him so to his face).

Stuart performed for more than 100,000 people at the Millennium March on Washington in 2000. He appeared on the groundbreaking comedy Will & Grace in 2000, and reprised his role in 2002. He released his first comedy album, Gay Comedy Without A Dress, in 2001.

In 2002, Stuart had what was described as a semi-regular role playing a gay therapist on the Damon Wayans comedy My Wife and Kids.

Stuart wrote, produced, and starred in his first film, 10 Attitudes in 2004. The same year, he appeared on House. His first televised comedy special, Jason Stuart: Making It to the Middle, aired on the Here TV cable network in 2005. A year later, he appeared in the comedy crime film Puff, Puff, Pass and was nominated for a Gay International Film Award for Best Supporting Actor for his role in the 2006 independent film Coffee Date. 2008 saw him guesting on Everybody Hates Chris, and in 2009 he appeared on the television series The Closer, in a gay-themed remake of The Pit and the Pendulum, on Logo TV comedy series One Night Stand-Up, and an episode of the comedy series It's Always Sunny in Philadelphia.

By 2010, Stuart was one of the most in-demand character actors in the United States, and was a favorite of casting directors who wanted a gay or sexually ambiguous performance.

Refocus on dramatic acting
After spending two decades primarily as a stand-up comedian, Stuart decided to refocus his career on acting in 2012. After learning about the tax breaks that some U.S. states offer production companies, he hired an agent in each of these states and began auditioning nationwide. He portrayed the officiant who marries John Lithgow and Alfred Molina in the critically lauded 2014 film Love is Strange, and appeared in the highly praised 2015 independent feature Tangerine, an innovative production shot with three iPhone 5S smartphones. That same year, he had a guest shot on the TV series Sleepy Hollow, and toured the country with a new stand-up show, I'm Only Gay on the Weekends. The show found a permanent home for a year at the Purple Room, a Palm Springs supper club and jazz venue.

Stuart found his most prominent role to date in the 2016 dramatic period film The Birth of a Nation. In the motion picture, a fictionalized version of Nat Turner's slave rebellion, Stuart plays Joseph Randall, a white, racist plantation owner and rapist. He was deeply disturbed by the racism and violence in the screenplay, leading him to only read it through once. To prepare for the film, Stuart read books on slavery in the Antebellum South and worked for a week perfecting his scenes with actor friends. Stuart told San Diego Jewish World that the role was life-changing, and he rededicated himself to being honest and truthful in his performances. Stuart says it is his favorite role.

In January 2019, Stuart's streaming independent comedy series Smothered premiered. Co-created and co-written with co-star Mitch Hara, the series is about two gay Jewish men who have been married for 30 years but now find their relationship falling apart. Unable to get a divorce for financial reasons, the neurotic men struggle to find an accommodation. Stuart and Hara were both nominated for Best Digital Performance and Smothered for Best Series at the 2021 Queerty Awards. In April 2022, Stuart won the award for Best Actor in a Comedy at the Indie Series Awards. A second season of Smothered began airing on Amazon Prime in the fall of 2022. Stuart also starred as the title character in the 2019 short film Hank, and had a small role in the 2019 independent fantasy anthology film Immortal.

Stuart published his autobiography, Shut Up, I'm Talking: Coming Out in Hollywood and Making It to the Middle, in late 2019. The title of the book came from a phrase his mother repeatedly said while he was growing up.

As of March 2021, Jason Stuart had more than 150 acting credits. That year, he appeared in an episode of the streaming legal drama Goliath,
That month, he released his second comedy album, I'm the Daddy and I Have Candy.

Labor activism
Jason Stuart is a member of the performers' union SAG-AFTRA. He co-founded and co-chairs the union's National LGBT Actors Committee, the union's first committee for LGBT people. Stuart was one of those who excoriated journalist Ramin Setoodeh during the Newsweek gay actor controversy. Setoodeh argued in his magazine piece that audiences do not accept openly LGBTQ actors in heterosexual roles. Stuart called Setoodeh's argument "wrongheaded" and said it "sends a damaging and false message that we are limited in the roles we are able to play. ... Unfortunately, harmful attitudes like those of Setoodeh are used to pressure actors to stay in the closet. Our work is clearly not done, and we will continue to fight to end fear within the acting community that being open about who you are means the end of your career. I'm an actor; it's not who I am but what I can play that counts."

In his role as LGBT Committee co-chair, Stuart was the moderator of the first Transgender Actor Panel at the Outfest LGBTQ-oriented film festival in Los Angeles in 2015. Panelists included Alexandra Billings, D'Lo, and Mya Taylor.

In June 2019, Stuart and other members of the SAG-AFTRA LGBT Committee marched as a contingent at the NYC Pride March.

Personal life
Stuart was raised Jewish, but says his family was more observant of tradition than it was religious. As an adult, he identifies as a secular Jew.

Stuart says he relies on his memories of family for a good deal of his comedy act. Stuart is "guardedly friendly" with his older brother and half-siblings from his father's second marriage, but estranged from his younger sister. Leonard Greif died in 2012.

Stuart was single as of 2019. He told an interviewer that year: "I've been a complete failure in every relationship so there's nowhere to go but up!"

Filmography

References
Notes

Citations

External links

Jason Stuart on Facebook
"ActorsE Chat Show" with host Alyson Sullivan on Actors Entertainment
Jason Stuart on clean and sober comedy site Recovery Comedy

1959 births
Living people
Male actors from New York City
American male film actors
American male television actors
American male comedians
American gay actors
Jewish American male actors
Jewish male comedians
People from the Bronx
LGBT Jews
Gay comedians
LGBT people from New York (state)
Comedians from New York City
21st-century American Jews
American LGBT comedians